Margarita Petrovna Nazarova (November 26, 1926 in Pushkin – October 26, 2005 in Nizhny Novgorod) was a Russian circus performer best known for her leading role in the 1961 comedy Striped Trip. She was awarded the title of People's Artist of the RSFSR.

Filmography
 Striped Trip
 Tamer of Tigers

References

External links 
 

Soviet circus performers
People's Artists of Russia
Honored Artists of the RSFSR
Russian actresses
Soviet actresses
1926 births
2005 deaths
People from Pushkin, Saint Petersburg
Animal trainers
20th-century Russian women